Leucheria is a genus of flowering plants in the family Asteraceae.

Leucheria is native to South America and the Falkland Islands.

 Species

References

Nassauvieae
Asteraceae genera
Taxa named by Mariano Lagasca